Iulian Ilie Miu (born 21 January 1976 in Roşiorii de Vede, Teleorman County) is a Romanian former football player. He played for Liga I clubs such as Steaua București, and abroad in Turkey at Bursaspor.

Honours

Club
Steaua București
Diviza A: 1996–97, 1997–98, 2000–01
Cupa României: 1996–97, 1998–99
Supercupa României: 1998
Bursaspor
Turkish Second League: 2005–06

References

External links

1976 births
Living people
People from Roșiorii de Vede
Romanian footballers
FC Progresul București players
FC Steaua București players
FC UTA Arad players
FCM Bacău players
Bursaspor footballers
CS Concordia Chiajna players
Romania international footballers
Romania under-21 international footballers
Liga I players
Liga II players
Süper Lig players
TFF First League players
Expatriate footballers in Turkey
Romanian expatriate footballers
Association football fullbacks